Forest Row was a railway station  on the Three Bridges to Tunbridge Wells Central Line which closed in 1967, a casualty of the Beeching Axe.

The station opened on 1 October 1866 and the buildings were designed by Charles Henry Driver.

The station was one of the busiest of the intermediate stations on the line and was enlarged in 1897 with the addition of a new platform on the Down side, connected to the main station side via a footbridge. The station also had a goods shed and two sidings. Ironically, the station's final years saw an increased number of passengers using it as residential development took place around the old Forest Row village. In recognition of the increased patronage, commuter trains from London were extended from East Grinstead to terminate here. At the time of closure, Forest Row was taking over £5,000 per annum in revenue and 200 commuters were using the station to travel to London each day.

After the station closed, it was used for the filming of an episode of the children's television programme Do Not Adjust Your Set in August/September 1967 featuring a young David Jason. The site was then sold to a club for over £4,000 and the station buildings were quickly swept away. Nevertheless, a short section of the station platforms can still be found, and the goods shed stands together with other light industrial units. A brick-built coal merchant's office can also be found on Station Road.

Gallery

See also 

 List of closed railway stations in Britain

References 

Disused railway stations in East Sussex
Former London, Brighton and South Coast Railway stations
Railway stations in Great Britain opened in 1866
Railway stations in Great Britain closed in 1967
Beeching closures in England
1866 establishments in England
1967 disestablishments in England
Charles Henry Driver railway stations
railway station